American Porn Songs is a remix album by 16volt, released on May 11, 2010, by Metropolis Records. The album comprises remixed versions of the tracks the appear of the band's 2009 album American Porn Songs.

Track listing

Personnel
Adapted from the American Porn Songs: Remixed liner notes.

16volt
 Mike Peoples – guitar, bass guitar
 Eric Powell – lead vocals, guitar, programming, keyboards

Additional performers
 Bryan Barton (as Bryan Black) – remix (7)
 Angel Bartolotta – remix (16)
 Jason Bazinet – remix (17)
 Kaine Delay (as Kaine.D3l4y) – remix (6)
 Chris Demarcus (as Loud Chris Demarcus) – remix (17)
 Jamie Duffy – remix (2)
 Erica Dunham – remix (17)
 Eric Gottesman – remix (13)
 Stacey Hoskins – remix (12)
 Jeremy Inkel – remix (6)
 Anthony Kirksey – remix (15)
 Christopher Lombardo – remix (11)
 Sean Payne – remix (2)
 Ross Miller – remix (5)
 Evan Roberts – remix (9)
 Scott Robison – remix (10)
 Tim Sköld – remix (3)
 Bill Sarver (as Billdeaux) – remix (1)
 Bradley Templin – remix (8)
 Alexandre Villommet – remix (14)

Production and design
 David Din (as Da5id Din) – mastering

Release history

References

External links 
 
 American Porn Songs: Remixed at Bandcamp
 

2010 remix albums
16volt albums
Metropolis Records remix albums